Buxar district is one of the thirty-eight districts of Bihar state, India.

This is list of villages of Buxar district according to respective blocks.

Barhampur 

 Adharpa
 Akorhi
 Arjunpur
 Atrauliya
 Babhani
 Bagen
 Baghaunch (Ditto)
 Baghi
 Bahduri
 Bairia
 Balua
 Bararhi
 Barhampur
 Baruhan
 Basudharpah
 Baswar
 Bhada
 Bhadsari
 Bhadwar
 Bharkhar
 Bhojwalia
 Bisupur
 Bojhwalia
 Chak Durjanpur
 Chak Pheralal
 Chakani
 Chandarpura
 Chaube Chak
 Choubey Bala Gangbarar
 Chulhan Chak
 Churamanpur
 Dallupur
 Dangrabad
 Dekuli
 Dhadha
 Dhaf Chapra
 Dhan Chhapra
 Dharauli
 Dhebani
 Dhorhanpura
 Dubauli
 Dundh Chapra (Ditto)
 Ekdar
 Ekrasi
 Gahauna
 Gaighat (Part)
 Garhatha Kalan
 Garhatha Khurd
 Gayghat
 Ghanshampur
 Ghinhu Chapra
 Ghinhu Chapra (Sukul Chapra)
 Harnathpur
 Hathilpur
 Jaipur
 Jogia
 Jug Chapra
 Kaithi
 Kant
 Kapurpur
 Karanpura
 Kathia
 Khochariyawan
 Kisagar
 Kodai
 Kuawan
 Kurthiya
 Madhukara
 Maharajganj
 Mahaur Naubara
 Mahuar
 Maji Karanpur
 Manipur (Ditto)
 Manki
 Menhmarara
 Milki Bisupur
 Nainijor
 Nainijor Diara Pachhim (Ditto)
 NainijorDiaraPachhimTurkau
 Nandpur
 Nimej
 Pahari Chak
 Pakrahi
 Palatpura
 Pandepur Path (Ditto)
 Panrepur
 Parnahi
 Piprarh
 Pirthi Chapra (Part)
 Pokharhan
 Pokhra (Ditto)
 Purwa
 Raghunathpur
 Rahthua
 Rajpur
 Ramdiha
 Ramgarh
 Ranipur
 Rudrapur
 Rupah
 Sapahi (Ditto)
 Sukalpura
 Udhaura
 Umedpur

Buxar 

 Ahirauli
 Ammadarhi
 Arjunpur
 Babhani
 Balapur
 Balua
 Balua
 Baluwa
 Barka Nuawan
 Baruna
 Basauli
 Belahi
 Belaur
 Betwa
 Bhabhuar
 Bhabhuar Milki
 Bhatauliya
 Bhosrampur
 Bibiganj
 Bishunpura
 Boksa
 Buxar (Nagar Parishad)
 Chhotka Nuawan
 Churamanpur
 Dahiwar
 Dalsagar
 Darappur
 Desarbuzurg
 Dubauli
 Dubauli
 Dubauli
 Dudhar Chak
 Dumariya
 Dungurpur
 Ganauli
 Garani
 Gharaipur
 Gobindapur
 Gobindpur
 Gogaura
 Gohuwana
 Gopnuawan
 Haripur
 Harkishunpur
 Hukaha
 Ijribudhan
 Ijrisiram
 Jagdara
 Jagdishpur
 Jagdishpur
 Jarigawan
 Jaso
 Jatmahi
 Kamarpur
 Kamhariya
 Kamkarahi
 Karauniyan
 Karhansi
 Katkaulia
 Khadra
 Kharanti
 Kharka
 Khutaha
 Kiratpura
 Korarawa
 Kothia
 Kudratipur
 Kulhariya
 Lachhmanpur
 Lachhmipur
 Lalganj
 Lalsagar
 Larai
 Laropur
 Mahdah
 Majhari Naubarar
 Majharia
 Manauwar Chak
 Marautiya
 Marwa
 Mathia
 Mathia Gurdas
 Milki
 Misraulia
 Misraulia
 Misrauliya
 Mungraul
 Nadaon
 Narayanpur
 Nat
 Nidhua
 Niranjanpur
 Nuaon
 Padumpur
 Paharpur
 Panditpur
 Panditpur
 Panrepatti
 Panrepur
 Parari
 Parari
 Parasiya
 Parmanandpur
 Patelawa
 Pipra
 Pirtampur
 Puliya
 Rahasi Chak
 Rahua
 Ramdiha
 Rampur
 Ramubariya
 Sagrampur
 Sahupara
 Sarimpur (CT)
 Shankarpur
 Sherpur
 Shiupur
 Simra
 Sohani Patti
 Sonbarsa
 Sondhila
 Suratpur
 Tarapur
 Thora
 Thoragangbarar
 Tiwaripur
 Umarpur
 Umarpur Diara
 Umarpur Diara (Ditto)
 Umarpur Naubarar
 UmarpurJot MisranBarkaGaon
 Upadhyapur
 Usrauliya

Chakki 
 Arak
 Bedauli
 Bhariar
 Chanda
 Charkhi
 Hemdapur
 Henwan
 Jawahi (DItto)
 Jawahir Diara (Ditto)
 Kalyanpur (Ditto)
 Liladharpur
 Minapur (Ditto)
 Parsia
 PranpurDegreiSudaprivi Council
 Sheopur Diar (Ditto)
 Sheopur Diara
 Sheopur Diar Janubi (Ditto)
 Sheopur Diar Somali (Ditto)

Chaugain 
 Amsari
 Baida
 Belahri
 Bhadi
 Birpur
 Chaugain
 Chhotka Dih
 Dangauli
 Kherhi
 Khewali
 Mangpa
 Masahariya
 Murar
 Nachap
 Nokhpura
 Ojhabarawan
 Panrepur
 Parasiya
 Phaphdar
 Puraina
 Reuntiya
 Samusar
 Thari

Chausa 

 Akhauripur
 Alawalpur
 Alawalpur
 Baghelwa
 Bahabuddin Chak
 Bahadurpur
 Bairampur
 Balbhaddarpur
 Banarpur
 Bechanpurwa
 Betbandh
 Bhadua
 Bhilampur
 Bishunpur
 Burhadih
 Chausa
 Chunni
 Debi Dehra
 Dehri
 Deuriya
 Dharamagatpur
 Dharampur
 Dhundhani
 Gopalpur
 Goshainpur
 Hadipur
 Hafizwa
 Hinguhi
 Holartikar
 Husenpur
 Isapur
 Jagdishpur
 Jalilpur
 Jalwandei
 Jokahi
 Kanak Narayanpur
 Kathgharwa
 Kathtar
 Kharagpura
 Khelafatpur
 Khemrajpur
 Khorampur
 Kocharhi
 Kusahi
 Kusrupa
 Madanpura
 Madhopur
 Mahdewa
 Mahmudpur
 Mahuari
 Manipur
 Mianpur
 Mohanpurwa
 Narainapur
 Narbatpur
 Narbatpur Taufir
 Nawagawan
 Nawar
 Nikris
 Nyayapur
 Ora
 Paliya
 Pauni
 Pithari
 Puraina
 Rajapur
 Rampur
 Rampur Khurd
 Rasulpur
 Rohinibhavan
 Sagra
 Salarpur
 Sarenja
 Sauri
 Sauwanbandh
 Sharifpur
 Sikraur
 Sonpa
 Tikaitpur
 Tiwaya
 kashipur
 konia

Dumraon 

 Adpha
 Amthua
 Araila
 Ariyawon
 Asapur
 Athaon
 Bairia
 Bankat
 Basgitia
 Basgitiya
 Belamohan
 Bharkhara
 Bharkunria
 Bhikha Bandh
 Bhojpur Jadid
 Bhojpur Kadim
 Chanda
 Chhatanwar
 Chilhari
 Chuar
 Churamanpur
 Dahigana
 Dakhinawan
 Dhangain
 Dheka
 Dihri
 Dubkhi
 Dumraon (Nagar Parishad)
 Ekauni
 Hakimpur
 Harni Chatti
 Hata
 Hathelipur
 Kachainiya
 Kam Karahi
 Kamdharpur
 Kanjharua
 Karuaj
 Kashia
 Khairahi
 Khairahi
 Kopwa
 Kudria
 Kulhawa
 Kumbhi
 Kunriya
 Kuransarae
 Kusalpur
 Lahana
 Lakhan Dehra
 Lohsar
 Marsara
 Marwatia
 Mathila
 Mirchi
 Misraulia
 Misraulia
 Mohammadpur
 Mohanpur
 Mugaon
 Mungasi
 Mustafapur
 Nandan
 Naudiha
 Nazirganj
 Nenuan
 Nikhura
 Niranjanpur
 Noaon
 Parmanpur
 Partap Sagar
 Phogu Tola
 Pipri
 Piria
 Puraini
 Rajdiha
 Rampur
 Rasulpur
 Rehiya
 Sagarpur
 Sahipur
 Samhar
 Saro Dih
 Sarora
 Sikta
 Sirampur
 Sowan
 Sundarpur
 Suraundha
 Tulshipur
 Turiganj
 Uderampur
 Udhopur
 Usrauliya

Itarhi 

 Alampur
 Alampur
 Atraulia
 Atrauna
 Aurahi
 Bagahipatti
 Bahuara
 Baikunthpur
 Bairi
 Baksara
 Baladewa
 Baniapatpur
 Bara Dih
 Barhana
 Barkagaon
 Baruna
 Basantpur
 Basao
 Basaon
 Basudhar
 Bhakhwa
 Bhaluha
 Bhar Chakia
 Bharparasi
 Bhatbahuwara
 Bhelupur
 Bhikhanpura
 Bhitihara
 Bijhaura
 Binodpur
 Bishunpur
 Chamela
 Chameli
 Chandi
 Chandpur
 Chandu Dehra
 Charaia Tikar
 Charaia Tikar Sahi
 Chilbila
 Chilbili
 Chilhar
 Dalippur
 Daru Dehri
 Dasarathtal
 Debkali Dharampura
 Dehria
 Dewasthapur
 Dhanbakhra
 Dharampur
 Dharampura
 Fatehpur
 Gadaipur
 Gangapur
 Garua Bandh
 Ghiuria
 Girdharpur
 Girdharpur
 Gobindpur
 Gopalpur
 Gopalpur
 Gopinathpur
 Goppur
 Hakimpur
 Hansraj Dih
 Harpur
 Harpur
 Harpur
 Hetampur
 Hundrahi
 Indarpur
 Indaur
 Indaur
 Inglish
 Isharpura
 Itarhi
 Itaunha
 Jah
 Jahanpur
 Jaipur
 Jalwasi
 Jamuaon
 Jigna
 Kadipur Kalan
 Kadipur Khurd
 Kaithana
 Kaleanpur
 Kaliyanpur
 Kanpura
 Kapurpatti
 Karanjuwa
 Karmi
 Kasimpur
 Kauresar
 Kauresari
 Kawalpokhar
 Khakrahi
 Khanta
 Kharhana
 Khatiwa
 Khekhsi
 Konch
 Kukurha
 Kushahi
 Lakshmipur
 Lodhas
 Lohandi
 Madan Dehra
 Mahamadpur
 Mahila
 Makhdumpur
 Makundpur
 Malkaudha
 Mananpur
 Mangolpur
 Mangolpur
 Manoharpur
 Marufpur
 Mathauli
 Misraulia
 Mitanpura
 Mohanpur
 Murarpur
 Murtazapur
 Mustafapur
 Nahrar
 Narayanpur
 Nathpur
 Nihalpur
 Nirbhaipur
 Orap
 Ori
 Paharpur
 Pakri
 Panditpur
 Panrepur Khairi
 Parasi
 Parsia
 Parsotimpur
 Pasahara
 Pauna
 Pithanpura
 Pithni
 Raghupur
 Raipur
 Raksia
 Ramrapur
 Rasulpur
 Reka Kalan
 Reka Khurd
 Sahipur
 Samda
 Santh
 Sanwabahar
 Saraia
 Sarasti
 Shauna
 Shukraulia
 Sibpur
 Sidhabandh
 Siktauna
 Sukul Chak
 Tirpurwa
 Turai Dehra
 Udaipura
 Ugarsanda
 Ujiarpur
 Unwans

Kesath 
 Baijnathpur
 Dasiyawan
 Degauli
 Dehra
 Jairampur
 Katkinar
 Kesath
 Kharagpur
 Kharauniya
 Kirni
 Kulmanpur
 Raghunathpur
 Rampur
 Shiwapur
 Siddhipur

Nawanagar 

 Arap Khurd
 Athar
 Athar Arazi
 Atmi
 Babuganj English
 Bahuara
 Bahuara
 Barahra
 Baraleo
 Baraon
 Bararhi
 Barasath
 Barhauna
 Basdewa
 Belahri
 Belaon
 Bhadar
 Bharkundiya
 Bhatauli
 Bhelwaniya
 Bikrampur
 Bisuwa
 Burhaila
 Chakaura
 Chanwath
 Chauria
 Chhatrdhariganj
 Dafar Dehri
 Deoria
 Dewanpura
 Dhanbakhra
 Dhanej
 Dhapachhuha
 Dihri
 Dihupur
 Dubauli
 Dubauli
 Dulaicha
 Ghorsari
 Gobinapur
 Gorhiya
 Gunja Dihri
 Haroj
 Ikil
 Itaudha
 Jitwa Dehri
 Kabir Chak
 Kanjia
 Kariyakant
 Karsar
 Katalpur
 Kazi Dehri
 Kewatia
 Kharagpur
 Kharaicha
 Kharaumiyan
 Kukur Bhuka
 Kunjnara
 Lokpur
 Mahuari
 Makundpur
 Manahatha
 Mankadih
 Mardanpur
 Mardanpur Arazi
 Mariyan
 Maudiha
 Narayanpur
 Narhan Dih
 Nawanagar
 Newazipur
 Nokhpur
 Non Phar
 Nonaura
 Paniari
 Paniyaon
 Panrepur Pheku
 Param Dihri
 Pararia
 Parmanpur
 Parmesarpur
 Parsaganda
 Patar Kona
 Pawanrpur
 Piprarh
 Purainiyan
 Raika
 Rajan Dehri
 Ranbirpur
 Rewatia
 Rupsagar
 Salempur
 Salsala
 Sara
 Satohari Dih
 Sewai
 Sikraur
 Somosar
 Sonbarisa
 Tetarahar
 Tetrahar
 Tik Pokhar
 Turaon Khas
 Turaon Patti
 Usra
 Usra
 Waina

Rajpur 

 Ahiyapur
 Ahladpur
 Akaurhi
 Akbarpur
 Amarpur
 Anpura
 Asraypur
 Atraulia
 Atraulia
 Babanbandh Gauri
 Babanbandh Manrajgir
 Baghelwa
 Bahrampur
 Bahuwara
 Baikunthpur
 Balmikpur
 Bamhani
 Bamhnaulia
 Banauwa
 Banni
 Bansi Chak
 Barki Puraini
 Barupur
 Basahi
 Basantpur
 Bhagwanpur
 Bhagwanpur
 Bhaluha
 Bharatpur Paranpur
 Bharkhara
 Bharkhara
 Bhikhanpur
 Bijauli
 Birbalpur
 Birna
 Bisambharpur
 Bishunpur
 Chacharia
 Chakia
 Chandpur
 Chandpur
 Chaubepur
 Chaubepur
 Chaubepur
 Chhatauna
 Chhatupur
 Chhitan Dehra
 Chhitan Dehra
 Chhotki Puraini
 Chintamanpur
 Dadura
 Dariyapur
 Dastepur
 Dayalpur
 Dehria
 Deopur
 Dewarhiya
 Deyalpur
 Dhanaipur
 Dhansoi
 Dharanipur
 Dharmagatpur
 Dhobahi
 Dulpha
 Dulphi
 Ekdar
 Gadaipur
 Gaidhara
 Gajarahi
 Gangapur
 Ganj Shakari
 Ghurahupur
 Gobardhanpur
 Gogahi
 Gogaura
 Gyani Chak
 Hajipur
 Halka Hankarpur
 Hankarpur
 Harpur
 Hethua
 Hinganpur Satgharwa
 Hirapur
 Indapur
 Intwa
 Isarpur
 Ismailpur
 Ismailpur
 Itarhia
 Jagal chak
 Jagmanpur
 Jaipura
 Jairampur
 Jalalpur
 Jalhara
 Jalhara Talas
 Jamauli
 Jamuni Dehri
 Jamupur
 Jiwapur
 Jogapur
 Kailakh
 Kaithahar Kalan
 Kaithahar Khurd
 Kakaria
 Kalupur
 Kanehri
 Kanhupur
 Kanpura
 Karaila
 Karanpur
 Karma
 Kataria
 Kathaja
 Katharai
 Kathrai
 Khadar
 Khanpur
 Khanpur Mafi
 Kharaunia
 Kharaunia
 Kharhana
 Kharika
 Khempur
 Khemrajpur
 Khilla
 Khiri
 Khochrihan
 Khoraitha
 Kishunipur
 Kishunipur
 Konauli
 Kunrwa
 Kusahi
 Lakhma
 Lala Chak
 Lalu Chak
 Lodipur
 Lugra Sugra
 Madanchaura
 Madhubani
 Mage Dehri
 Mahadewpur
 Mahes Dehra
 Makhduman
 Maksudanchak
 Makundpur
 Makuriya
 Malahipur
 Manajit chak
 Mangopur
 Mangraon
 Mani
 Manian
 Manikpur
 Manikpur
 Manipur
 Manoharpur
 Marahi
 Masarhia
 Matukipur
 Matukpur
 Mobarakpur
 Mohanpur
 Moharihan
 Mohrihan
 Mohrihan
 Nagpur
 Naniaura
 Narayanpur
 Narayanpur
 Narayanpur
 Orwar
 Panapur
 Pandepur
 Pankhipur
 Parbat Chak
 Parmanandpur
 Parsia
 Pasipur
 Patej
 Patkhaulia
 Pipra
 Piprarh
 Piyare Chak
 Raghunathpur
 Raghunathpur
 Rajpur
 Ramdhanpur
 Rampur
 Ranni
 Rasen Kalan
 Rasen Khurd
 Ratan Chak
 Rauni
 Repura
 Rupapokhar
 Sagrawan
 Saikuwa
 Saitapur
 Saithu
 Sakhuana
 Samahuta
 Sansarpur
 Sarae Kans
 Saraon
 Sarayan
 Semaria
 Shahbazpur
 Shahpur
 Shankarpur
 Shyampur
 Sigti
 Siri Kantpur
 Sisaudha
 Sisrarh
 Sitabpur
 Soni
 Sugahar
 Sugra
 Sujayatpur
 Sukhapur
 Tajpur
 Taranpur
 Tiara
 Tikaitpur
 Tikaura
 Tirkalpur
 Trilochanpur
 Udhopur Kita Awal
 Udhopur Kita Checharum
 Udhopur Kita Doem
 Udhopur Kita Seum
 Utari
 Uttampur
 kajariya

Simri 

 Arazi Kashi Shingan Pura
 Arazi Kashi Singhanpura
 Arjunpur
 Balihar
 Bankat
 Barbatara
 Basgitiya
 Belarpur
 Berahimpur
 Bhakura
 Bhan Bahrauli
 Bharathpa
 Bhaudatahi
 Bhinikpura
 Bhirgu Ashram
 Bijalpur
 Bilaspur
 Bisu Sirkhiri
 Chakani
 Chandpali
 Chaukiya
 Chhitanpura
 Chunidanr
 Dabauli
 Daunpura
 Dhakaich
 Dhanaha
 Dhanaipur
 Dhanapah (Ditto)
 Dhanrajepur
 Dia Parmeswar
 Diaman
 Domanjhakhra
 Dubauli
 Dubauli
 Dubauli Mahesh
 Dubha
 Dubha Taufir
 Dullahpur
 Dullahpur
 Dumri
 Durasan
 Ekauna
 Ganauli
 Gangauli
 Gayaghat
 Gop Bharauli
 Gopalpur
 Haranpura (Ditto)
 Hirpur
 Imirta
 Jagdeopur
 Jalalpur
 Kanspatti
 Kathar
 Kazipur
 Keshopur
 KeshopurRajpurDegree Suda (Ditto)
 Khaira
 Khaira
 Khandhara
 Kharagpur
 Kharhatanr
 Koliya
 Kot (Ditto)
 Kusahara
 Lachhmipur
 Lakhrawan
 Lakri
 Mahrauli
 Majhwari
 Majhwari
 Majhwari Gautam
 Makundpur
 Manikpur
 Marwatiya
 Misrauliya
 Mohanpur
 Nag Amirta
 Nag Singhanpura
 Nagarpura
 Nagpura
 Nagwan Jagdish
 Nagwan Kalika
 Narayanpur
 Narayanpur Bisen
 Nemauwa
 Neyazipur
 Neyazipur
 Neyazipur
 Nikhura
 Paigambarpur
 Paila Dih
 Pakari
 Panrepur
 ParanpurDegreeSudaPrivyCouncil
 Parari
 Parmanpur
 Partappur
 Pitambarpur
 Pratappur Naubarar (Ditto)
 Purandarpur
 Raipur Kalan (Rajipah)
 Rajapur
 Rajapur Taufir
 Rajauli
 Rajpur Kalan
 Rajpur Kalan ( Dusari Geyan)
 Rajpur Kalan (Balipur)
 Rajpur Kalan (Bhatkara)
 Rajpur Kalan (Bhimpah)
 Rajpur Kalan (Bishunpur)
 Rajpur Kalan (Dalipur)
 Rajpur Kalan (Dalpatpur)
 Rajpur Kalan (Dhusari Bhan)
 Rajpur Kalan (Dhusari Dhari)
 Rajpur Kalan (Dilia)
 Rajpur Kalan (Dullahpah)
 Rajpur Kalan (Dullahpah)
 Rajpur Kalan (Garaya)
 Rajpur Kalan (Jagdishpur)
 Rajpur Kalan (Kalwari)
 Rajpur Kalan (Kamkarhi)
 Rajpur Kalan (Mathauli Kalan)
 Rajpur Kalan (Mathauli Khurd)
 Rajpur Kalan (Parnahi)
 Rajpur Kalan (Parsanpah)
 Rajpur Kalan (Patsar)
 Rajpur Kalan (Sultanhi)
 Rajpur Kalan (Sonikpur)
 Rajpur Kalan (Parnahi Khurd)
 Ramdhanpur
 Rampah   (Ditto)
 Rampur
 Rampur Mathiya
 Rani Singhanpura
 Ranipatti
 Sabdalpur(Ditto)
 Sahiyar
 Sahiyar Bhagar
 Salempur
 Saranga
 Semrauna
 Semri English
 Semri English
 Shahpur Gangabarar (Ditto)
 Shikarpur
 Simri
 Sirkhiri
 Sisuhar
 Sonbarsa
 Sorbatara
 Sundarpur
 Taranpur (Ditto)
 Tiwari Gangauli
 Usmanpur

References 

Buxar district

Buxar district